Sowbane mosaic virus (SoMV) is a pathogenic plant virus, infecting potato and grapevine. Infected species present chlorotic mottling and lesions, followed by yellow flecking and star-shaped patterns.

References

External links
 ICTVdB - The Universal Virus Database: Sowbane mosaic virus
 Family Groups - The Baltimore Method
 Descriptions of Plant Viruses - Association of Applied Biologists

Sobemoviruses
Viral plant pathogens and diseases
Potato diseases
Viral grape diseases